Hans Jacobsen may refer to:

 Hans Jacobsen (sport shooter) (1881–1945), Danish sports shooter
 Hans Jacobsen (trade unionist) (1872–1943), Danish trade union leader
 Hans Fredrik Jacobsen (born 1954), Norwegian musician and composer
 Hans Sivert Jacobsen (1836–1901), Norwegian politician

See also
 Hans Jacobson (1947–1984), Swedish pentathlete
 Hans Jakobsen (1895–1980), Danish gymnast